Translators without Borders (TWB) is a non-profit organization  set up to provide translation services for humanitarian non-profits. As of 2012 it had about 1600 vetted volunteer translators. TWB aims to close the language gaps that hinder critical humanitarian efforts by connecting non-profit humanitarian organizations with a volunteer community of professional translators, building language translation capacity at the local level and raising awareness globally about language barriers.

The organization provides services to humanitarian non-profit organizations in need of translated content. Some of these include Doctors Without Borders, Medecins du Monde, UNICEF, Oxfam, Handicap International.  Some examples of information translated by Translators without Borders includes reports, vital health information, and crisis response material for organizations responding to emergencies around the world, such as Burundi, Liberia and Greece. The organization translates over 10 million words per year. According to their website, Translators without Borders has donated over 50 million translated words to non-profits.

In 15 June 2017, TWB and The Rosetta Foundation (TRF) agreed to merge operations. The merger, announced at the Localization World conference in Barcelona, brought together the two leading non-profit organizations focused on better access to information in languages people understand.

Working with translators

Translators without Borders translation platform
ProZ.com created an online automated translation platform for Translators without Borders in May 2011.  This translation center was referred to as the Translators without Borders Workspace. Approved non-profits post translation projects and TWB volunteer translators pick up the jobs they wish to work with.

The use of the Workspace greatly increased the productivity of Translators without Borders. When projects were handled manually, TWB translated 29 projects, with 37,000 words of text, in seven language pairs, for nine different organizations. In January 2012, seven months after the Translators without Borders Workspace was completed, they translated 183 projects, with 280,000 words, in 25 language pairs, for 24 organizations. In 2015 Translators without Borders reported to have delivered 7 million translated words through 780 projects to 214 aid organizations. In early 2017, TWB upgraded its translation platform by adding machine assisted translation technology and translation memory. The enhanced platform was named Kató. In June 2017 Translators without Borders merged with The Rosetta Foundation, an Irish registered non-profit organization that works to relieve poverty, support healthcare, develop education and promote justice through equal access to information and knowledge across the languages of the world.

Volunteers

TWB accepts applications from people who are fluent in at least one language other than their native language. Professional translators are especially encouraged to apply. Applications are fast-tracked for translators American Translators Association certified, at Lionbridge, ProZ.com Certified PRO or with a MITI qualification from the UK Institute of Translating and Interpreting. These fast-track applicants are given credentials to join Translators without Borders. Since merging with The Rosetta Foundation in mid-2017, the volunteer community is now larger and counts about 26,000 language professionals.

Projects

Words of Relief project

Words of Relief (WoR) is a translation crisis relief network intended to improve communications when the crisis response humanitarian workers and affected populations do not speak the same language. Words of Relief works to eliminate linguistic barriers that can impede relief efforts during and after a crisis by doing the following:

Translating key crisis and disaster messages into the relevant languages and disseminating openly before crises occur.
Building a spider network of diaspora translators who can translate from world languages into regional languages and who are trained to assist right away.
Creating a crowd sourced, online (and mobile) application that connects the translation team with aid workers and data aggregators who need immediate help (entitled the Words of Relief Digital Exchange - WoRDE).

Words of Relief was piloted from January 2014 to May 2015 in Nairobi, Kenya and concentrated on Swahili and Somali. Approximately 475,000 words of crisis relief content from various sources including the Infoasaid Message Library were translated.

The Words of Relief model has been deployed to respond to several crises worldwide, including the Ebola emergency in West Africa and the Nepal earthquake. Rapid Response Teams in Arabic, Persian, Greek, Kurdish and Urdu are currently providing rapid translations for aid organizations along the refugee route in Europe. Teams of professional volunteers work with partners to translate information on reception centres and ferry strikes, signage for the centres, and health information.

Words of Relief relies on a crowd-sourced, online (and mobile) application, called the Words of Relief Digital Exchange (WoRDE). The platform was launched in 2014 and it connects teams of rapid response translators with aid workers to do  translations during a sudden onset crisis.

Words of Relief is supported by the Humanitarian Innovation Fund, a program managed by ELRHA. The Words of Relief Digital Exchange is funded by Microsoft's Technology for Good.

Information in the Right Language
An Impact Study was conducted to measure the comprehensibility of English information posters compared with translated Swahili posters and it showed that there is a very clear difference in the levels of comprehension, in favour of the translated Swahili poster. Initially, only eight per cent of respondents answered simple questions about the disease correctly. When respondents were given simple information about the disease in English, correct answers rose to 16%. But when given this information in Swahili, respondents got 92% of the questions correct.

The HealthPhone project
One of the Translators without Borders projects is in partnership with the Mother and Child Health and Education Trust in India. HealthPhone, which was founded and created by Nand Wadhwani, creates health videos that are preloaded to phones throughout India and beyond. The videos cover a variety of health issues, such as breastfeeding, malnutrition, post-natal and newborn care, and more.

Through translators, videos are subtitled so that people throughout India (and in Africa) who do not speak or read the source language can learn from the videos. So far videos have been subtitled into about 10 Indic languages, Swahili and Spanish.

Simple Words for Health
Simple Words for Health (SWFH), a simplified medical terminology resource, was set up in 2014. SWFH is a database of 12,000 essential medical terms that have been simplified and translated into more than 40 world languages by qualified doctors and trained medical translators.

Wikipedia 
In 2011, Translators without Borders began a collaborative effort to translate key medical articles on English Wikipedia into other languages. The WikiProject Medicine Translation Task Force first improves the 8 medical articles deemed most essential to WP:GA or WP:FA status. When the articles are improved, they are translated into simplified English by Content Rules (the simplified English is provided on the Wikipedia simplified English site) and a goal of more than 100 languages. Eventually, the hope is articles will be translated into all of the 285 languages that Wikipedia exists in. This process is expected to take several years.

All content is available through mobile networks and some content without data charges through the Wikipedia mobile partners Telnor, Orange and STC in Africa, South East Asia and the Middle East. Many of the articles are available in spoken Wikipedia. Some of these articles are also pending publication in open access general medical journals.

Training Center in Kenya
In April 2012, Translators without Borders opened its first Healthcare Translation Center in Nairobi. In the Center, located in Nairobi Kenya, new translators are trained to work in Kiswahili, as well as a number of the other 42 languages spoken in Kenya. Since the Center was first launched in 2012, basic translation training has been provided to over 250 people. This project focuses on healthcare information translated into Swahili.

The purpose of the Healthcare Translation Center is to intensively train local Kenyans to become professional translators. These translators assist in the process of getting healthcare information out in Swahili. These translators are recruited to the training center due to backgrounds in language or in health.

Management
Translators without Borders is managed by a board of directors. Day-to-day operations are managed by a staff who report to an Executive Director and senior management staff.

See also 
 Science and Development Network

References

External links
 
 TSF site

Mentions by the press
"Translators fight the fatal effects of the language gap" The Guardian, April 11, 2012 
"Leveraging the Web to Overcome Challenges in the Developing World", EContent Magazine, July 5, 2012
"Translating Health Content Without Borders", Global Voices, August 30, 2012
"Editing Wikipedia Pages for Med School Credit" The New York Times, September 29, 2013
"Should I be getting health information from Wikipedia", The Atlantic, October 1, 2013
Quest to Spread Dignity, Born in Calcutta, The Global Calcuttan, July 1, 2015
"Translators without Borders Take on Ebola", The BBC World Service Radio
"Lesbos: Online Volunteers Bridge Language Gap", News Deeply, March 2016
"Making sure refugees aren't lost in translation - with one simple app", UNHCR Innovation,'' April 19, 2016

 

 

Translation associations
Organizations established in 1993
501(c)(3) organizations
Non-profit organizations based in Connecticut
Articles containing video clips
Companies based in Danbury, Connecticut